Nites is a genus of moths of the family Depressariidae.

Species
 Nites atrocapitella McDunnough, 1944
 Nites betulella Busck, 1902
 Nites grotella Robinson, 1870
 Nites maculatella Busck, 1908
 Nites ostryella McDunnough, 1943

References

 
Depressariinae